R. or r. may refer to:

 Reign, the period of time during which an Emperor, king, queen, etc., is ruler.
 Rex, abbreviated as R., the Latin word meaning King
 Regina, abbreviated as R., the Latin word meaning Queen
"Charles V (r. 1519–1556)")
 Abbreviation R., meaning "the Crown" or "the state" in criminal prosecution in Commonwealth realms (e.g. "R. v Defendant")
 R., an album by American singer R. Kelly

See also

 R (disambiguation)
 
 
 R, eighteenth letter of the English and Latin alphabets